Lars-Göran Carlsson (July 24, 1949 – July 27, 2020) was a Swedish sport shooter who won the silver medal in the skeet shooting event at the 1980 Summer Olympics in Moscow.

References

1949 births
2020 deaths
Shooters at the 1980 Summer Olympics
Olympic shooters of Sweden
Olympic silver medalists for Sweden
Olympic medalists in shooting
Medalists at the 1980 Summer Olympics
20th-century Swedish people
21st-century Swedish people